Jurgen Vogli (born 12 June 1993) is an Albanian footballer who plays for FK Egnatia in the Albanian First Division.

References

External links
 Profile - FSHF

1993 births
Living people
People from Peqin
Association football defenders
Albanian footballers
Albania under-21 international footballers
KS Shkumbini Peqin players
KF Elbasani players
KS Lushnja players
KS Egnatia Rrogozhinë players
KF Teuta Durrës players
Kategoria Superiore players
Kategoria e Parë players